Granulomatous prostatitis is an uncommon disease of the prostate, an exocrine gland of the male reproductive system. It is a form of prostatitis (prostate inflammation), resulting from infection (bacterial, viral, or fungal), BCG vaccine, malacoplakia or systemic granulomatous diseases which involve the prostate.

Pathogenesis 
Prostatic secretions escape into the stroma and elicit an inflammatory response.

Histopathology 
Noticeable destruction of Acini, surrounded by epitheloid cells, giant cells, lymphocytes, plasma cells and dense fibrosis.

References

External links 

Inflammatory prostate disorders
Men's health